a.k.a. Torasan and the Painter and Tora-san's Sunset Glow is a 1976 Japanese comedy film directed by Yoji Yamada. It stars Kiyoshi Atsumi as Torajirō Kuruma (Tora-san), and Kiwako Taichi as his love interest or "Madonna". Tora-san's Sunrise and Sunset is the seventeenth entry in the popular, long-running Otoko wa Tsurai yo series.

Synopsis
During his travels, Tora-san meets Ikenouchi, a drunken old man whom he assumes is poor and homeless. Tora-san takes the old man home. When he wakes up, Ikenouchi begins ordering Tora-san's family around in such an authoritarian manner that no one can muster the courage to suggest he leave. On the road again, Tora-san meets Botan, a geisha who has lost her life savings to a dishonest customer. He and his family's neighbor are determined to help her out. It later turns out that Ikenouchi is a famous artist and a drawing he has made for Tora-san is worth ¥70,000.

Cast
 Kiyoshi Atsumi as Torajirō
 Chieko Baisho as Sakura
 Jūkichi Uno as Ikenouchi
 Kiwako Taichi as Botan (Geisha)
 Masami Shimojō as Kuruma Tatsuzō
 Chieko Misaki as Tsune Kuruma (Torajiro's aunt)
 Gin Maeda as Hiroshi Suwa
 Hisao Dazai as Boss (Umetarō Katsura)
 Gajirō Satō as Genkō
 Asao Sano
 Hayato Nakamura as Mitsuo Suwa
 Senri Sakurai as Tourist agency manager
 Yoshiko Okada as Shino
 Akira Terao as Tourist agency employee

Critical appraisal
Tora-san's Sunrise and Sunset was the third top Japanese box-office winner of 1976. The Japanese academic film journal Kinema Junpo named it the second best Japanese release of the year. For her role in the film Kiwako Taichi was named Best Supporting Actress at both the Hochi Film Awards and the Kinema Junpo Awards ceremonies.

Stuart Galbraith IV judges Tora-san's Sunrise and Sunset to be one of the best of the Otoko wa Tsurai yo series, singling out the performances of guest stars Kiwako Taichi and Jūkichi Uno. The German-language site molodezhnaja gives Tora-san's Sunrise and Sunset three and a half out of five stars.

Availability
Tora-san's Sunrise and Sunset was released theatrically on July 24, 1976. In Japan, the film was released on videotape in 1996, and in DVD format in 1997 and 2008.

References

Bibliography

English

German

Japanese

External links
 Tora-san's Sunrise and Sunset at www.tora-san.jp (official site)

1976 films
Films directed by Yoji Yamada
1976 comedy films
1970s Japanese-language films
Otoko wa Tsurai yo films
Japanese sequel films
Shochiku films
Films with screenplays by Yôji Yamada
1970s Japanese films